The W. H. Young House is a historic house at 316 Meador Lane in Arkadelphia, Arkansas.  The two story wood-frame house was built in 1921 for the William Hatley Young family, and is a high-quality locally rare example of the American Craftsman style of architecture.  It exhibits the classical elements of this style, including exposed rafter ends, a deep porch with knee bracing, and a large second-story dormer.

The house was listed on the National Register of Historic Places in 2006.

See also
National Register of Historic Places listings in Clark County, Arkansas

References

Houses on the National Register of Historic Places in Arkansas
Houses completed in 1921
Houses in Arkadelphia, Arkansas
American Craftsman architecture in Arkansas
National Register of Historic Places in Clark County, Arkansas